Lanave is a locality located in the municipality of Sabiñánigo, in Huesca province, Aragon, Spain. As of 2020, it has a population of 2.

Geography 
Lanave is located 36km north of Huesca.

References

Populated places in the Province of Huesca